Allen Lake is a lake located southeast of the Village of Richfield Springs in northern Otsego County, New York. It is a natural lake, but a low earthen dam and concrete spillway were installed to raise the lake level. The main outflow is Trout Brook, also known as White Creek, which flows into Otsego Lake. Allen Lake is the water supply for Richfield Springs.

History 
By 1820, fresh water was being shipped in to the Village of Richfield Springs from Weatherby Pond to the north. As the village grew, it required a steadier supply of fresh water. At first water came from the two holding reservoirs along US Route 20 east of Richfield Springs. This was still not enough water, and Allen Lake was purchased by the village. At first a steam pump pumped the water above ground but later it was buried and tunnelled through the divide so it could be gravity fed. Most of the main cast iron transmission line from the old steam pump location to the village was installed in 1880, with the exception of the roughly  section that was tunnelled through the divide in the 1920s, so that it could be gravity fed. In 1994, when the present water plant was built, pumps were added, although it could still be gravity fed.

Lower reservoirs
There are two small reservoirs located directly east of the village along US 20. It is kept full by throttling a manual valve on a branch line coming off the main line from Allen Lake. The water travels through the aerial fountain on the upper reservoir to aerate the raw water.

References 

Lakes of Otsego County, New York